Beacon Theatres, Inc. v. Westover, 359 U.S. 500 (1959), was a case decided by the Supreme Court of the United States dealing with jury trials in civil matters.  The court held that where legal and equitable claims are joined in the same action, the legal claims must be tried by a jury before the equitable claims can be resolved.

Cornell Law School's Legal Information Institute summarized it like this:

The question was whether the exclusive agreement of Fox Theatres with the distributor Westover for first-run movies was reasonable.

See also
List of United States Supreme Court cases, volume 359
Fox Theatres
Seventh Amendment to the United States Constitution
Galloway v. United States
 Dairy Queen, Inc. v. Wood, 369 U.S. 469.
 Ross v. Berhard

References

External links
 
 

United States Seventh Amendment case law
United States Supreme Court cases
United States Supreme Court cases of the Warren Court
1959 in United States case law